Notable people named James Bulger include:

 Whitey Bulger (1929–2018), organized crime boss and FBI informant
 James Bulger (1990–1993), English murder victim